Moka is a village in Mauritius.

Moka may also refer to:

 Moka Akashiya, a character from the anime/manga Rosario + Vampire
 Moka exchange, a gifting ritual that establishes social status among the Kawelka of Papua New Guinea
 Moka pot, a type of coffee pot
 Moka (film), a 2016 Franco-Swiss film
 Moka (album), a 2009 album by Kaori Mochida
 Zoran Moka Slavnic (born 1949), a Serbian basketball player and coach

Places
 Moka District, the district in Mauritius where the village of Moka is located
 Moka Range, a mountain range north of the village of Moka in Mauritius
 Moka, Equatorial Guinea, a town on the island of Bioko in Equatorial Guinea
 Moka, Hiiu County, a village in Hiiu County, Estonia
 Moka, Rapla County, a village in Rapla County, Estonia
 Moca, Puerto Rico, a municipality of Puerto Rico
 Mooka, Tochigi (also spelled "Moka" or "Mōka"), a city in Japan

See also
Mokas, a village in Masovian Voivodeship, Poland
Mocha (disambiguation)
MOCA (disambiguation)
MOCCA (disambiguation)